is a Japanese manga series written and illustrated by Cocoa Fujiwara. It was serialized in Square Enix's shōnen manga magazine Monthly Gangan Wing from 2002 to 2007. Square Enix published 12 tankōbon volumes in Japan. The manga is set in the same world as Fujiwara's other work, Watashi no Ookami-san.

Plot
This story is about a girl named Chiruha who is a Lycanthrope, a mythical creature thought to have died out. She lives in the mountains alone in an abandoned hut with only a small television. Chiruha decides to leave her home and live with the humans. When there she discovers her childhood friend, Kisara. Kisara, though, has no memories of when he was friends with Chiruha. What he does remember is that he was supposedly cursed with immortality by a Lycanthrope. He believes Chiruha gave him immortality as curse and hates her for it, although this is not the case. Kisara was the adopted son of a rich nobleman and was being bullied when he was saved by Chiruha. They became friends, but after Chiruha was attacked by some villagers they both run away to live on their own. Two men who were sent to get Kisara and kill Chiruha accidentally hurt Kisara fatally. During that moment Chiruha unintentionally gave Kisara her immortality. When being used as a human sacrifice to drive away demons, Kisara remembers this and does not know what to feel since he can no longer hate her but can't go back to the past. He decides to just keep going forward and asks the captain if he could stop being the military's pawn.

After that it switches to characters from Watashi no Ookami-san. This is back to the past when Chiruha was using her powers. Both Subaru, the ex-demon lord, along with Komomo and General Purino (along with Kurenai and Carol) react to Chiruha's powers and go to find the source.  Purino and Subaru all come on a mission to go to where Chiruha is. When they meet Chiruha doesn't know how to help them but wants to become friends.

Characters
Chiruha
Chiruha is supposedly the last remaining lycanthrope at the beginning of the series. It is revealed early in the series that when she was young she isolated from society for purposes of protection, as her potential power was too great. At this time, she knew Kisara, and they were friends. One day while running away from home, they ran into a group of men who were trying to take Kisara back home. While trying to kill Chiruha, the men accidentally wound Kisara fatally. In an attempt to save Kisara, Chiruha unknowingly transfers her immortality to Kisara (chapters 7 to 8). Years later, Kisara seemingly out of her life, Chiruha summons her courage and joins the human world, walking to a nearby village. Here she reunites with Kisara, and starts living with him and becoming friends with the punitive squad, while meeting new demon friends who join them. It is then revealed that Chiruha loves Kisara in many ways, not limited to friendly love.
Chiruha has straight black hair that initially is shoulder length with bangs, but grows slightly longer as time goes by. She often wears a kimono and stockings. Her signature style is bows; she often wears one in her hair and there is often a large one on the back of her kimono that is at her waist. Ume once gave her a bikini that had bows on it, which resulted in Kisara's over protectiveness when he saw her in it with other guys around.

Demon Continent Inhabitants

Subaru
Subaru was once the demon lord, and was the target of Komomo, but he falls in love with Komomo and decides to abdicate his throne so that he could go support her on her. Because he refuses to sacrifice humans, however, he begins to show a rejection reaction from his right Lyncanthrope hand that was given to him by the Lyncanthrope so that he could hold the position as the demon lord. The rejection could kill him if left alone, which leads to Komomo's determination to visit the human continent to find the other Lycanthrope for information regarding a way to heal his hand.

Subaru has black hair that is styled to the side, as noted by Komomo that he looks more youthful when his hair is not styled. Due to his cool composure, tall stature, and manly appearance, many women and Cain swoon over him, though he only has eyes for Komomo. Chiruha thinks that he is handsome because he looks like a king from a TV show, much to Kisara's annoyance because she called him cute rather than handsome, resulting in Chiruha whole-heartedly assuring him that he is beautiful.

Komomo
Komomo is a human magic holder whose goal is to be a hero so that she can be able to build a house that she promised her mother before she died. Because she is poor and at level 0, she often takes on small jobs. Her initial goal is to defeat Subaru when he was the demon lord, but Subaru likes Komomo so much that he abdicates his throne to help Komomo with her journey. Komomo then begins to develop feelings for Subaru, and then she starts on her journey to the human continent with the goal of healing Subaru's cursed Lyncanthrope hand. Subaru often teases Komomo, which leaves her annoyed, but she still harbors feelings for him. Throughout the story, Komomo's impoverished background shows through her actions; she spends money very sparingly and even finds methods of making dishes out of tofu.

Komomo has straight, very light blonde hair that is styled in a bob with bangs, though it is revealed she had long hair in the past. Her signature style is rather frilly tops and miniskirts, giving off a Lolita-like appearance. Her clothes were given to her by Ume; she once complained to him about how she'd prefer simpler clothes, but Ume's response suggests that he is giving what suits her the most.
Purino
Purino is a beautiful but clumsy general in the demon continent who travels along with Kurenai and Carol to find out information on their ex-lord's hand. Sometimes, she will suddenly start to act like a puppy when she is exposed to Lyncanthrope magic. She once liked Subaru because of his kindness, but she supports Subaru and Komomo's relationship. Purino is often insecure about her abilities, despite holding the important position as general. Because of her beauty, she is even subject of a fan club, consisted of boys she doesn't know. Purino also plays the violin, along with her brother.

Purino has long chestnut colored hair that is slightly wavy with bangs. Due to her position as general, she often wears more formal, scholarly clothing, although she likes dresses too. It is shown that she is also insecure of her body, since she  was displeased that Ume gave her a bikini even when she asked not to because she is not as slim as Komomo or Chiruha, contrary to the fact that Komomo once complimented her on her more voluptuous body.
Kurenai
Kurenai has red hair and although he is a demon, he has no powers and is therefore a skilled swordsman. He has a temper that his friend Carol often likes to provoke for comical reasons. Although Kurenai has a tough outward personality, he in truth is a very gentle person that loves animals- another side that Carol likes to tease to gauge his reaction. Kurenai is often mad at Subaru's seemingly selfish decisions, but he understands Subaru as well and secretly wishes for the best of Subaru. Although Subaru has once joked that Kurenai is gay so that Komomo would be misinformed, it is implied that Kurenai developed feelings for Purino over time.
Carol
Carol is a lifelong friend of Kurenai and goes on a journey along with him and Purino to find out about Subaru's hand. He, as a demon, wields magical power and uses amulets and paper to activate it, making him very skilled in the battle field. He is a cheerful person that often likes to play mind games on people, especially Kurenai, for laughs. Despite this, he is also very understanding of people's emotions, as shown in talk with Purino and Kurenai about their pasts as well as his observation of Kisara's reactions involving Chiruha. This emotional understanding is most likely due to his experience at an orphanage church that he spent time in as a child.
Carol has short white hair and is the youngest of the characters at 16 years old in the beginning of the story. He is rather short and is very youthful looking, which is one of his insecurities and is why he works out excessively every day in an attempt to make himself look more masculine. He has many female friends because they often find him to be cute and he could easily hold a conversation with them.

Punitive Force 
Kisara
Having forgotten his childhood memories of the strange girl who lived in the mountains, Kisara grows up with the police force, knowing that he is immortal and remembering only that a lycanthrope (revealed to be Chiruha) "cursed" him with it. Over the years, he developed a hatred for the lycanthrope who changed his body. When Chiruha appears out of the blue, Kisara seems determined to gain her trust and then kill her, as revenge for the "curse". After attempting to kill her in her sleep, his memories return and he realizes that she saved his life, and that she didn't even know what she had done (chapter 7). After this, Kisara slowly starts falling in love with her.
Before getting his memories back, he had a cold and distant personality. Then when his memories came back in chapter 8, he shows a more caring and heartwarming personality, mainly to Chiruha. He seems to only smile more for Chiruha. 
Kisara is the vice-captain of the Punitive Force. Before meeting Chiruha, he was bullied because of his girly face.

Captain Cain Clevart
Cain is supposed to be the head of the Punitive Squad and is the superior of Kisara, having met Kisara for the first time and his special abilities, he intended to use Kisara for missions. But later on he realizes Kisara's true pain from the events of his childhood, and started thinking of him as a brother. He is constantly praising the "beauty" of others and is especially attracted to Purino, Kisara, and Subaru.
When Chiruha's identity get revealed by accident, Cain resolves to make a pact between the "demon lord's army" saying that both parties are trying to protect their companions and they will have to act together onwards to reach their goals.

Other Punitive Force Members
The other punitive force members play a small role in the story, often serving comic relief purposes, and they often fawn over girls like the maid, Purino, and Komomo. Cain thinks that they are ugly. They are not always aware of what is going on, but they are always there for support.

Enemies 
Sigma
Sigma wishes for Subaru's obedience and wants to live with Chiruha forever so they, as the last of the Lycanthropes, may pass on the Lycanthrope bloodline. He has strange tendencies like refusing to take off his stuffed animal mask. His goals are to kill Kisara so that Chiruha could regain her immortality and to get Subaru to sacrifice more humans for him. He relied on human lives for an extended life and is currently weak due to his age. However, he is still extremely powerful in magic and could heal himself faster than Kisara.

Kanade
Kanade works alongside Mimosa to help Sigma. At first he seems to have helped the punitive force, but he cannot abandon Sigma. He also seems to care a lot for Mimosa; he puts a lot of effort to make her feel better about her unrequited love with Sigma but he often fails. Kanade doesn't like to deal with serious situations, so he often brings a lot of party equipment with him.
Although he is seen with dark clothing in public, he wears an apron while doing household jobs.

Mimosa
Mimosa works alongside Kanade to help Sigma, the man who she loves and would do anything for, although she understands that Sigma prefers his own kind.
Mimosa has a dog that is the complete opposite of Ume; she is female, has black fur, and shoots powerful laser-like rays out of her mouth instead of being able to vacuum everything in like Ume. In the last chapter, she can be seen next to Ume.

Loria
Loria is an actress popular among Lolicons, as shown by her two followers. She is narcissistic and selfish, both traits shown among children with poor behavior, which her followers find to be cute. She refers to herself in a third person point of view and bosses her two men around. She could take away a magic holder's stamina instantly, making her very dangerous in battle.

Izumo
Izumo wears glasses and has black hair, he is more polite than his counterpart but he is just as dangerous, with his mastery of bombs. He is also more of a devout fan of Loria than his counterpart is.

Others
Abel
Abel is the inspector of the punitive force that brings comic relief due to his hiding techniques, punctuality, and the fact that he seems to know everything about the person he is inspecting; he never fails to surprise someone. He, surprisingly, is involved in many different activities, and even talked about an animal club to Kurenai. He has a daughter who loves to cake her face with makeup, and it is later revealed that he is Kisara's father as well.
Kaname
He is the seventh generation of a family-owned bun store that Chiruha frequently visits throughout the manga. He showed Cain the way of love by telling stories of his wife and himself. Kaname is a romantic who often loses touch with reality.
Ume 
Ume is a dog that Subaru once used as his messenger. He is later raised by both Subaru and Komomo, since Komomo loves animals. He provides Komomo clothing and would even provide Purino and Chiruha clothing, if needed, by regurgitating clothes out of his mouth. In an extra, it was revealed that Ume simply consumes random clothing and regurgitates them, forming them into different styles depending on the receiver (frilly clothing for Komomo, simple clothing for Purino, and clothes with bows for Chiruha). Ume could somehow fit anything into his body, as his mouth is like a vacuum, which is the reason why Subaru and Komomo could ride a luxurious boat to the human continent because Ume won a dog competition by putting bigger dogs' heads in his mouth.
Purino's Brother
Purino had always referred to her brother as more skilled than her, though it shows that he is just as clumsy as her. He cares about Purino very much though Kurenai views him as awkward due to his overly firm handshake.
He wears glasses and has short hair the same chestnut shade as Purino, she dressed scholarly like Purino and clumsiness seems to run in the family as he, his sister, and their mother all have it.

References

External links

Gangan Comics manga
2002 manga
Japanese audio dramas
Shōnen manga